This article is a list of notable individuals who were born in and/or have lived in Prairie Village, Kansas.

Arts and entertainment

Film, television, and theatre
 Sandahl Bergman (1951– ), actress, dancer, stuntwoman
 Eric Darnell (1961– ), director, screenwriter, voice actor
 Chuck Norris (1940– ), actor, martial artist, producer

Journalism
 Joe McGuff (1926–2006), Kansas City Star sportswriter and editor
 Ramesh Ponnuru (1974– ), columnist, pundit

Literature
 Jason Aaron (1973– ), comic book writer

Music
 Joyce DiDonato (1969– ), mezzo-soprano opera singer
 Abe Ismert, Eli Ismert, and Henry Ismert of the metal band Hammerhedd

Business
 John Carmack (1970– ), computer programmer, co-founder of id Software
 Donald Fehr (1948– ), sports union executive
 Robert S. Kaplan (1957– ), President, Federal Reserve Bank of Dallas
 David Wittig (1955– ), energy executive

Crime
 Debora Green (1951– ), convicted murderer

Politics

National
 Larry Winn (1919–2017), U.S. Representative from Kansas

State
 Robert Bennett (1927–2000), 39th Governor of Kansas (1975–1979)
 Marci Francisco (1950– ), Kansas state legislator
 Jim Roth (1968– ), Oklahoma politician

Science
 Dan Connolly, computer scientist

Sports

Baseball
 Hank Bauer (1922–2007), right fielder, manager
 George Brett (1953– ), Hall of Fame designated hitter, 1st & 3rd baseman

Horse racing
 Ben Jones (1882–1961), thoroughbred horse trainer
 Horace Jones (1906–2001), thoroughbred horse trainer

Other
 Ray Evans (1922–1999), football halfback
 Ross William Guignon (1993– ), tennis player
 Tom Watson (1949– ), professional golfer

See also
 Lists of people from Kansas
 List of people from Johnson County, Kansas

References

Prairie Village, Kansas
Prairie Village